Agustín Montilla y Orendáin was a Spanish-Filipino entrepreneur, who was one of the first settlers of Negros Island to produce sugar from sugarcane in commercial quantities.

Early life
Agustín Montilla was born to Capitán Don José Montilla, who was interim Governor of the Mariana Islands from 15 August 1822 to 15 May 1823, and Josefa Orendáin. Agustin had four younger sisters: Maria Dolores, Manuela, Ignacia, and Carmen.

Descendants

Rene Alfred Anton Bustamante: Filipino botanist IPNI standard form: ; R.Bustam. relates to the same person. Research Associate at the Philippine Taxonomic Initiative.Vanilla raabii was named in his honor.
Emilio Montilla Abello: Executive Secretary to Philippine Presidents Jose Laurel, Manuel Roxas and Elpidio Quirino, Philippine Ambassador to the United States, Assemblyman in the Interim Batasan Pambansa, Chairman and President of Meralco and First Philippine Holdings, Chairman of PCI Bank, Founding Chairman of Metropolitan Bank and Trust Company.
Manuel Gutierrez Abello: 1958 Bar Topnotcher, Founding Partner of Angara Abello Concepcion Regala & Cruz Law Offices (ACCRALAW), former Chairman of the Philippine Securities and Exchange Commission.
Eduardo Gutierrez Abello: Former Chief Financial Officer of First Philippine Holdings, former Chief Credit Officer of International Finance Corporation.
Eduardo Jose P. Abello: Principal Specialist of Asian Development Bank, former Vice President of HSBC Securities, former Vice President of Bank of Tokyo-Mitsubishi, CFA charterholder.
José Montilla : part of the rebel delegation in the Negros Revolution.
Gil Montilla - Filipino politician
Soledad "Gretchen" Oppen-Cojuangco - widow of tycoon Eduardo Cojuangco Jr.
Manuel "Mar" Araneta Roxas II: Former senator of the Philippines.
Martha Rivilla - Grammatophyllum martae was named in her honor.
Jorge L. Araneta - President and CEO of the Araneta Group; son of J. Amado Araneta
Judy Araneta-Roxas - Papal Awardee, vice chair of the Araneta Group, political activist, social development practitioner, widow of former Senator Gerry Roxas the son of former Philippine President Manuel Roxas.
Margarita Forés - daughter of Maria Lourdes "Baby" Araneta-Fores, granddaughter of J Amado Araneta. Celebrity chef and businesswoman in Manila. Owner of 10 Italian inspired restaurants including Cibo, Pepato, Café Bola and Pepato restaurants. Other businesses include Fiori di M and Casa di M, high-end floral and housewares design, respectively. Designated as a UNWTO Ambassador for Gastronomy Tourism at the 23rd United Nations World Tourism Organisation (UNWTO) Congress.
Agustin Montilla IV - named one of the Philippines' top 100 lawyers by Asia Business Law Journal; listed as a leading lawyer in Chambers Asia Pacific, AsiaLaw Profiles, and The Legal 500 Asia Pacific.
Mercedes M. Montilla - 1936 Miss Philippines of the Manila Carnival and mayor of Sipalay, Negros Occidental for three terms.
Petronila "Girly" Peña Garcia - current Ambassador to Canada, the first career diplomat and first woman ambassador to be appointed to the post. Previously, she was Ambassador to Israel. Before that, she was Ambassador to Egypt with concurrent jurisdiction over the Sudan. The appointment made her the Philippines' first woman ambassador to be posted in an Arab country.

References

Spanish expatriates in the Philippines
People of Spanish colonial Philippines
People from Negros Occidental
1802 births
Year of death missing